Matthew Schuler (born 1992) is an American singer from Yardley, Pennsylvania. He came to national attention as a contestant on Season Five of The Voice.

Schuler grew up in Yardley, Pennsylvania and sang in a church community with his parents, who are both pastors. Schuler played in a rock band called Threshold as a high schooler, but quit the group in 2010 and entered West Chester University in 2011. In 2013 he auditioned for The Voice and was chosen by all four coaches on the show for potential collaboration. His rendition of Leonard Cohen's "Hallelujah" was successful as a single, reaching No. 40 on the Billboard Hot 100 in the United States and No. 38 on the Canadian Hot 100.

He is one of The Voice alumni to debut The Voice: Neon Dreams, a live concert project organized by the American The Voice. It will be held at the Hard Rock Hotel & Casino in Las Vegas.

Career

2013: The Voice

 – Studio version of performance reached the top 10 on iTunes

Matthew released his first single "Invincible" on July 11, 2015.

References

Singers from New York (state)
Living people
1992 births
The Voice (franchise) contestants
People from Yardley, Pennsylvania
21st-century American singers
21st-century American male singers